Fulani  proverbs are the folk wisdom of the Fulani people, expressed in their traditional sayings such as "munyal deefan hayre" (patience can cook a stone).

References

Citations

Sources

Leger, R. and Mohammad, A.B., 2000. The concept of Pulaaku mirrored in Fulfulde proverbs of the Gombe dialect. Berichte des Sonderforschungsbereichs 268, pp.299-306.

Fula
Fula people
Proverbs by language